The Cimarrones Festival is an annual festival in the municipality of Pili in the Philippines. The municipal government hosts the religious-based town fiesta in the "Pili Proper" centro district.

The festival is a celebration of the feast of San Rafael Archangel, the patron saint of Pili. It is celebrated annually every October 23–24 since the parish was founded in 1819. The festival is an annual cultural festival held throughout the month of October in Pili. It is celebrated by six barangays of Pili Centro District.

Etymology
The word "Cimarrones" came from during the promulgation of Christianity in the early 1770s by the Spanish missionaries, when the town houses the “Cimarrones” or the “Remontados” who resisted the foreign rule of the neighboring Hispanic city of Nueva Caceres. The early center of settlement in the town was located in "Binanuaanan" (from "banwaan" which means town in the Bikol language) until missionaries transferred it to the present site of the town proper where the St. Raphael Archangel Church is located.

History
In 1998, Mayor Tomas P. Bongalonta, Jr. encouraged all the public schools of Pili to present their different styles of street dancing in connection with the history of cimarrones tribes.  The festival features the town’s cultural heritage through the conduct of various activities which includes cultural presentation, sports festival and civic parade.

References

Cultural festivals in the Philippines
Camarines Sur
Roman Catholic festivals in the Philippines